Crocus cvijicii  is a species of flowering plant in the genus Crocus of the family Iridaceae. It is a cormous perennial native to northern Macedonia (Crna Gora), eastern Albania, to northern Greece.

References

cvijicii